Doubt is a 2008 American drama film written and directed by John Patrick Shanley, based on his Pulitzer Prize-winning and Tony Award-winning 2004 stage play Doubt: A Parable. Produced by Scott Rudin, the film takes place in a Catholic elementary school named for St. Nicholas, led by Sister Aloysius (Meryl Streep). Sister James (Amy Adams) tells Aloysius that Father Flynn (Philip Seymour Hoffman) might be paying too much attention to the school's only black student, Donald Miller (Joseph Foster), thus leading to Aloysius investigating Flynn's behaviour. The film also features Viola Davis as Donald Miller's mother, Mrs. Miller, in her first notable role.

The film premiered October 30, 2008, at the AFI Fest before being distributed by Miramax Films in limited release on December 12 and in wide release on December 25. Grossing $50.9 million against a budget of $20 million, the film received largely positive reviews from critics. Streep, Hoffman, Adams, and Davis were highly praised for their performances, and all were nominated for Oscars at the 81st Academy Awards. Shanley was also nominated for Best Adapted Screenplay.

Plot
In 1964 at a Catholic mass in The Bronx, Father Brendan Flynn gives a homily on doubt. The priest notes that like faith, it can be a unifying force. Sister Aloysius, the strict principal of the church's parish school, becomes concerned when she sees a boy pull away from him in the courtyard. Her sisters are told to be alert to suspicious activity in the school.

Sister James, a young and naive teacher, receives a request for Donald Miller, an altar boy and the school's only African-American student, to see Flynn in the rectory. He returns to class upset, and she smells alcohol on his breath. Later, she sees Flynn placing an undershirt in Donald's locker. Reporting her suspicions to Aloysius, she states that such suspicions disquiet her faith. Aloysius tells her that addressing wrongdoing causes the taking of a step away from God but in His service.

Aloysius and James invite Flynn into the office, supposedly to discuss the school's Christmas pageant. During their discussion, the women express drastically different perspectives on how the church should function regarding the working class. Flynn believes in relating to the parishioners more actively through shared interests and community activities, but Aloysius believes that clear boundaries, which are set by the clergy, facilitate the relationship with the parishioners.

Eventually, Aloysius brings up Donald by noting that his race causes him to be at risk of being singled out. She states that even Flynn gave him special treatment like their private last week. He becomes defensive over her insinuations and eventually reveals he called Donald to the rectory because he had been caught drinking sacramental wine. Flynn had been keeping it quiet to protect Donald, but now that Aloysius has forced it out, he must be removed as an altar boy. James is greatly relieved to hear the explanation. Flynn's next homily is on the evils of gossip.

Unconvinced, Aloysius meets with Donald's mother regarding her suspicions. When describing the potential abusive relationship between Donald and Flynn, she is shocked by Mrs. Miller's seeming ambivalence. Finally, the mother tearfully admits that Donald is gay and fears his physically-abusive homophobic father would kill him if he knew. She describes her difficult position: unable to protect her son from his father's violence, Flynn is the only male figure who has shown Donald any kindness. His position at the school shields him from bullies, and leaving the school now could compromise the better socio-economic future that the school can give Donald. She begs Aloysius to solve the situation by removing Flynn over Donald, but she is unsure of what she can do because of Flynn's entrenched position within the patriarchal senior clergy.

Knowing that she has spoken with Donald's mother, Father Flynn threatens to remove Aloysius from her position if she does not back down. She informs him that she contacted a nun from his last parish and discovered a history of past infringements. He demands to know what proof she has, and she admits that all she has is her certainty. Flynn accuses her of insubordination and acting outside her duties. She threatens that she will do whatever it takes to force him out even if it means being thrown out of the church herself.

Declaring his innocence, Flynn pleads and asks if she herself has never committed a mortal sin. Aloysius rejects his claims of innocence and threatens blackmail   if he does not resign immediately. Acknowledging that his downfall would be inevitable if he ignores her threats, he maintains that he did nothing wrong and that her own certainty of wrongdoing is fallible. She demands Flynn request a transfer, which he does, delivering a final homily before departing.

Sometime later, Aloysius tells James that Flynn has since been appointed to a more prestigious position at a larger church. She reveals that she lied about contacting a nun at Flynn's former parish and reasons that if it were false, the ruse would not have worked. To her, his resignation is proof of his guilt. James, still believing in Flynn's innocence, is shocked by her lie, but Aloysius restates, "In the pursuit of wrongdoing, one steps away from God." However, she adds that doing so comes with a price. She then breaks down by tearfully exclaiming, "I have doubts... I have such doubts!"

Cast
 Meryl Streep as Sister Aloysius Beauvier, the parish school principal
 Philip Seymour Hoffman as Father Brendan Flynn
 Amy Adams as Sister James, a history teacher at the school
 Viola Davis as Mrs. Miller, Donald Miller's mother
 Joseph Foster as Donald Miller, the school's first black student

The other sisters in the film include Alice Drummond as Sister Veronica, Audrie J. Neenan as Sister Raymond, and Helen Stenborg as Sister Teresa. The child actors who played the students of the school include Mike Roukis as William London, Lloyd Clay Brown as Jimmy Hurley, Frank Shanley as Kevin, Frank Dolce as Ralph, Paulie Litt as Tommy Conroy, Matthew Marvin as Raymond, Bridget Clark as Noreen Horan, Molly Chiffer as Sarah, and Lydia Jordan as Alice. The actors who played the other staff of the school include Susan Blommaert as Mrs. Carson, Carrie Preston as Christine Hurley, John Costelloe as Warren Hurley, Margery Beddow as Mrs. Shields, Marylouise Burke as Mrs. Deakins, and Jack O'Connell as Mr. McGuinn.

Production
Production began on December 1, 2007. The film, which concentrates on a Bronx Catholic school, was filmed in various areas of the Bronx, including Parkchester, St. Anthony's Catholic School, and the College of Mount Saint Vincent, as well as Bedford-Stuyvesant, Brooklyn.
The "garden" exterior scenes were shot at the historic Episcopal Church St. Luke in the Fields on Hudson Street in New York's Greenwich Village. The associated St. Luke's School was also heavily featured.
The film is dedicated to Sister Margaret McEntee, a Sister of Charity who was Shanley's first-grade teacher and who served as a technical adviser for the movie, after whom Shanley modeled the character of Sister James.

Viola Davis was cast instead of Audra McDonald, Sanaa Lathan, Taraji P. Henson, Sophie Okonedo and Adriane Lenox.

This would mark John A. Costelloe's final film role as he would die four days after the film's release.

Reception

On Rotten Tomatoes, the film has a 79% approval rating based on 220 reviews, with an average rating of 6.99/10. The site's consensus reads, "Doubt succeeds on the strength of its top-notch cast, who successfully guide the film through the occasional narrative lull." Another review aggregator, Metacritic, gave the film a 68/100 approval rating based on 36 reviews. Critic Manohla Dargis of The New York Times concluded that "the air is thick with paranoia in Doubt, but nowhere as thick, juicy, sustained or sustaining as Meryl Streep's performance." Meryl Streep's performance as the stern, intimidating and bold principal Sister Aloysius Beauvier was praised, as were Philip Seymour Hoffman and Amy Adams's performances.

Viola Davis's performance as Mrs. Miller was praised by critics; Salon declared that the character was acted with: "a near-miraculous level of believability ... Davis, in her small, one-scene role, is incredibly moving—I can barely remember a Davis performance where I haven't been moved ... [she] plays her character, an anxious, hardworking woman who's just trying to hold her life and family together, by holding everything close. She's not a fountain of emotion, dispensing broad expression or movement; instead, she keeps it all inside and lets us in".

National Public Radio called Davis's acting in the movie "the film's most wrenching performance ... the other [actors] argue strenuously and occasionally even eloquently, to ever-diminishing effect; Davis speaks plainly and quietly, and leaves [no] doubt that the moral high ground is a treacherous place to occupy in the real world".

Roger Ebert, who thought Davis's performance worthy of an Academy Award, gave the film four stars, his highest rating, and praised its "exact and merciless writing, powerful performances and timeless relevance. It causes us to start thinking with the first shot", he continued, "and we never stop". Ebert goes on to say, "The conflict between Aloysius and Flynn is the conflict between old and new, between status and change, between infallibility and uncertainty. And Shanley leaves us doubting."

The film and the cast earned numerous awards and nominations including five Academy Award nominations: for Best Actress for Streep, Best Supporting Actor for Hoffman, Best Supporting Actress for both Adams and Davis, and Best Adapted Screenplay for Shanley.

The scholar Daniel Cutrara, in his book on sex and religion in cinema, commented that the film works as a metaphor for worldwide uncertainty over priests accused of pedophilia—specifically through Father Flynn's resignation as an indication of guilt and then Sister Aloysius's subsequent doubt.

Awards
Doubt received five Academy Awards nominations on January 22, 2009, for its four lead actors and for Shanley's script. It was the fourth film to date—following My Man Godfrey (1936), I Remember Mama (1948), and Othello (1965)—to receive four acting nominations without being nominated for Best Picture.

References

External links
 French, Philip. "Doubt" (film review). The Observer. Saturday February 7, 2009. Observer/Guardian Film Review
 
 
 

2008 drama films
2008 films
2008 in Christianity
American drama films
American films based on plays
American independent films
Films about Catholic nuns
Films about Catholic priests
Films about Catholicism
Films about educators
Films directed by John Patrick Shanley
Films produced by Scott Rudin
Films scored by Howard Shore
Films set in 1964
Films set in New York City
Films set in religious buildings and structures
Films set in schools
Films set in the Bronx
Films with screenplays by John Patrick Shanley
Media coverage of Catholic Church sexual abuse scandals
Miramax films
2000s English-language films
2000s American films